A perched coastline is a fossil coastline currently above the present coastline.  It can be produced by one of two factors:

 Higher sea levels in the past than today.  For example, during the last ice age interglacial period, climates were significantly warmer than today, and thermal expansion of the oceans, together with increased melting of glaciers, meant that sea levels were higher than they are today.  This has created evidence of perched coastlines all around the world.
 Through coastal uplift from local geological processes, particularly along the edges of rift valleys or subduction zones of tectonic plates.  This second kind of perched coastline is important archaeologically, as it can expose human remains that would otherwise be below sea level.

See also

 Paleoshoreline

Coastal geography
Coastal and oceanic landforms